I'm Never Afraid! (Dutch: Ik ben echt niet bang!) is a 2010 Dutch Super 16mm documentary film about Mack Bouwense an eight-year-old professional motorcross racer who has a mirrored heart, a condition known as dextrocardia. It is directed by award-winning Dutch filmmaker Willem Baptist and broadcast by VPRO on 20 November 2010. In German and French speaking countries the documentary was broadcast by ARTE.

It premiered at the International Documentary Film Festival Amsterdam, and screened at more than 100 film festivals worldwide including BFI London Film Festival, Slamdance, Sprockets; Toronto Film Festival, and Kraków Film Festival. It won multiple international awards including a Golden Gate Award at San Francisco International Film Festival, Documentary Short Grand Jury Prize at Atlanta Film Festival, and a Kinderkast Jury award non-fiction at Cinekid Festival. In 2011, the documentary was nominated for a broadcast award for Best Children Programme at the Netherlands Institute for Sound and Vision.

References

External links
 

2010 films
Dutch short documentary films
2010 short documentary films
Documentary films about children with disability
Motocross
Documentary films about sportspeople with disability
Dutch sports films
2010s Dutch-language films